Jim Crossan is a Northern Irish former football player and manager.

Crossan played with Derry City when they played in the Irish League, and represented them in both the European Cup Winners' Cup and European Cup. He was the club's first manager when they began competing in the League of Ireland, although his spell at the club, which began in 1985, did not last a full season. He was a Northern Ireland amateur international.

References

Living people
Association football defenders
Association footballers from Northern Ireland
Derry City F.C. players
NIFL Premiership players
Football managers from Northern Ireland
Derry City F.C. managers
League of Ireland managers
Year of birth missing (living people)